Dig In Deep is the seventeenth studio album by American singer-songwriter Bonnie Raitt. The album was released on February 26, 2016, by Redwing Records the first in 14 years to contain original music written by Bonnie.
The album once again primarily features her longtime band composed of Ricky Fataar on drums, George Marinelli on guitars and James "Hutch" Hutchinson on bass with newer member Mike Finnigan on keyboards.

Critical reception

Dig In Deep received generally positive reviews from music critics. At Metacritic, which assigns a normalized rating out of 100 to reviews from mainstream critics, the album received an average score of 82 based on 17 reviews, which indicates "universal acclaim". The album earned Raitt a nomination for "Artist of the Year" at the 2016 Americana Music Honors & Awards.

Accolades

Track listing

Personnel 
 Bonnie Raitt – lead vocals, electric slide guitar (1, 2, 3, 6-10), electric guitar (4), acoustic piano (5, 12), percussion (8), backing vocals (8), arrangements (12)
 Mike Finnigan – Hammond B3 organ (1, 2, 3, 5-10), clavinet (2), keyboards (3, 7), backing vocals (5, 6, 9), electric piano (9)
 George Marinelli – electric guitars (1-10), backing vocals (3, 6, 9, 10), acoustic guitar (4), finger snaps (4)
 James "Hutch" Hutchinson – bass guitar (1-10)
 Ricky Fataar – drums (1-10), percussion (1-9, 11), finger snaps (4), backing vocals (10)
with:
 Jon Cleary – electric piano (1), backing vocals (1, 5)
 Patrick Warren – keyboards (11, 12), arrangements (12)
 Bill Frisell – electric guitar (11)
 Greg Leisz – acoustic guitar (11)
 Joe Henry – acoustic guitar (11)
 David Piltch – acoustic bass (11)
 Jay Bellerose – drums (11)
 Arnold McCuller – backing vocals (4, 8, 9)
 Maia Sharp – backing vocals (4, 8)

Production 
 Producers – Bonnie Raitt (Tracks 1-10 & 12); Joe Henry (Track 11).
 Recorded and Mixed by Ryan Freeland
 Second Engineer – Pablo Hernandez
 Third Engineer – Josh Simmons
 Recorded at Henson Recording Studios (Hollywood, CA); Stampede Origin (Culver City, CA); The Garfield House (Pasadena, CA).
 Mixed at Stampede Origin
 Digital Technician – Boyz Bieber
 Mastered by Kim Rosen at Knack Mastering (Ringwood, NJ).
 Project Coordinator – Kathy Kane
 Art Direction and Design – Norman Moore at DesignartLA.com.
 Photography – Marina Chavez, Molly Bosted, Linda Posnick and Jason Farrell.
 Video Editor – Jason Farrell
 Make-up – Lori Depp
 Stylist – Kate Lindsey
 Prop Stylists – David Browne and Eddie Burke
 Management and Label – Kathy Kane, assisted by Annie Heller-Gutwillig and Chloe Monahan.
 Bass and Guitar Wrangler – Manny Alvarez

Charts

Singles - Billboard (United States)

References

2016 albums
Bonnie Raitt albums
Albums produced by Joe Henry